Alto dos Moinhos station is part of the Blue Line of the Lisbon Metro and is located close to Estádio da Luz, home of SL Benfica.

History
The station opened in October 14, 1988, in conjunction with the Colégio Militar and Laranjeiras stations, and it is located on Rua João de Freitas Branco, under the Avenida Lusíada viaduct. 

The architectural design of the station is by Ezequiel Nicolau. Since July 26, 1994, the Museu da Música is located inside this station.

Connections

Urban buses

Carris 
 754 Campo Pequeno ⇄ Afragide
 768 Cidade Universitária ⇄ Quinta dos Alcoutins

See also
 List of Lisbon metro stations

References

External links

Blue Line (Lisbon Metro) stations
Railway stations opened in 1988